Jean-François Gilles Colson, the son of Jean-Baptiste Gilles, was born in Dijon in 1733. He was a pupil of his father, of Frère Imbert at Avignon, and of Nonotte at Lyons. On coming to Paris he was presented to the Duke of Bouillon, who kept him in constant employment for forty years as architect, sculptor, painter, and even gardener. He gained a high reputation as a portrait painter, and left several manuscripts on perspective, poetry, and the fine arts. He died in Paris in 1803.

References
 

1733 births
1803 deaths
18th-century French painters
French male painters
19th-century French painters
Artists from Dijon
19th-century French male artists
18th-century French male artists